Raphitoma syrtensis is a species of sea snail, a marine gastropod mollusk in the family Raphitomidae.

Description

Distribution
This species occurs in the Mediterranean Sea off Tunisia

References

 Nordsieck F. (1977). The Turridae of the European seas. Roma: La Conchiglia. 131 pp.
 Giannuzzi-Savelli R., Pusateri F. & Bartolini S. (2018). A revision of the Mediterranean Raphitomidae (Gastropoda: Conoidea) 5: loss of planktotrophy and pairs of species, with the description of four new species. Bollettino Malacologico. 54, supplement 11: 1-77.

External links
 Biolib.cz: Raphitoma syrtensis
 Gastropods.com: Raphitoma linearis syrtensae
 
 Natural History Museum, Rotterdam: Raphitoma syrtensis

syrtensis
Gastropods described in 1977